Abe Kelmer / Abba Kelmer (September 20, 1905 – March 28, 2007) was a Polish professional wrestler, promoter and referee, known by the ring names Abe Coleman, Hebrew Hercules, and Jewish Tarzan. At the time of his death, Coleman was believed to be the oldest professional wrestler in the world, and the only known wrestler to live past the age of 100 years.

Early life 
Kelmer was born to a Jewish family in Żychlin, Poland in 1905. His father was a coal-seller. Kelmer had 15 older brothers and sisters, some of whom were murdered in the Holocaust. In 1923, he emigrated to Winnipeg, Manitoba, Canada, and later moved to New York City in the United States.

Professional wrestling career 
According to the Canadian Online Explorer's Greg Oliver, there is debate regarding Kelmer's debut in professional wrestling. In 1929, local promoter Rudy Miller offered Coleman $25 to wrestle after seeing him work out in a Brooklyn gym.  Despite this, an "Abe Coleman" wrestled to a draw with George Deslonchamps on March 19, 1928, at Madison Square Garden, but it is unknown if it was Kelmer or another wrestler with the same ring name.

Credited for inventing the dropkick, Coleman claims his inspiration to create the move came from kangaroos he observed while on a tour of Australia in 1930.

Coleman was never a champion but regarded as a solid mid-card standby. In the 1930s, Coleman defeated Jim Londos in a match in a Mexico City bullring in front of 60,000 spectators. During a 1936 match against Man Mountain Dean in front of 36,000 people, Coleman slammed Dean to the ground, breaking the ring mat and dropping the pair down to the arena floor.

Following his retirement from active in-ring competition, Coleman became a professional wrestling referee. He also promoted several wrestling shows with Bill Johnston.

After wrestling 
Following his retirement from wrestling, Kelmer inspected license plates for the New York State Department of Motor Vehicles.

Personal life 
Kelmer met June Miller in 1936, stating he met her in Madison Square Garden when he landed in her lap after being thrown from the ring. They married three years later in 1939. The couple had no children and Miller died in 1987. Kelmer lived in Forest Hills, New York. It was in Forest Hills that Kelmer subdued two attempted muggers when he was in his 80s.

Outside of wrestling, Kelmer's interests included poker and horse racing.

In his final years, Kelmer, primarily using a wheelchair, lived at the Meadow Park Rehabilitation and Health Care Center in Flushing, New York. Kelmer died on March 28, 2007, in a nursing home in Queens, New York, of kidney failure.

Championships and accomplishments 
Cauliflower Alley Club
Other honoree (1995)
Professional Wrestling Hall of Fame and Museum
Class of 2012 (Pioneer category)

See also
 List of oldest surviving professional wrestlers

References

External links 
Small bio from friendsofmicronesia.com
Archived Gordon Solie newsletter featuring an article on Abe Coleman's 90th birthday
Queens Chronicle article on Abe Coleman's 99th birthday
Queens Chronicle article on Abe Coleman's 100th birthday

1905 births
2007 deaths
20th-century professional wrestlers
People associated with physical culture
People from Kutno County
Polish centenarians
Men centenarians
20th-century Polish Jews
Polish professional wrestlers
Professional Wrestling Hall of Fame and Museum
Professional wrestling promoters
Professional wrestling referees
Sportspeople from Łódź Voivodeship
Polish emigrants to Canada
Canadian emigrants to the United States